Thomas Hooyberghs (born July 26, 1996) is a  professional footballer who plays for KFC De Kempen as a goalkeeper.

Career

Club career
Ahead of the 2019-20 season, Hooyberghs returned to Belgium and joined KFC Witgoor Sport Dessel. After half a season at Witgoor, he moved back to vv DBS in January 2020.

In April 2020 it was confirmed, that Hooyberghs would play for Belgian club KFC De Kempen from the upcoming season.

References

External links 

1996 births
Living people
Association football goalkeepers
Belgian footballers
Belgian expatriate footballers
K.F.C. Dessel Sport players
PSV Eindhoven players
Club Brugge KV players
FC Eindhoven players
Eerste Divisie players
People from Arendonk
Belgian expatriate sportspeople in the Netherlands
Expatriate footballers in the Netherlands
Footballers from Antwerp Province